Gao Baoxu (924–962), courtesy name Xinggong (省躬), was the fourth ruler of Jingnan (r. 960–962). He was the tenth son of Jingnan's second king Gao Conghui, and the younger brother of Jingnan's third king Gao Baorong.

Gao Baoxu has been described as a profligate and licentious ruler. He would summon prostitutes and muscular soldiers to his palace for group orgies in broad daylight, while he and his concubines watched from behind a curtain. Wasteful construction projects also caused widespread resentment among the population and the army. He cared little about governance, and Sun Guangxian's advice largely fell on deaf ears. He became critically ill 2 years into his reign, and on his death bed he decided to pass the throne to his nephew, Gao Baorong's son Gao Jichong, after consulting Liang Yansi (梁延嗣).

References

924 births
962 deaths
Jingnan rulers